Wag the Dog is the sixth soundtrack album by British singer-songwriter and guitarist Mark Knopfler, released on 13 January 1998 by Vertigo Records internationally, and by Mercury Records in the United States. The album contains music composed for the 1997 film Wag the Dog, directed by Barry Levinson. The film featured songs created for the fictitious campaign waged by the protagonists, including "Good Old Shoe", "The American Dream", and "The Men of the 303". These songs appear on the soundtrack album as instrumental tracks. Only the title track contains vocals.

Critical response

In his review for AllMusic, Stephen Thomas Erlewine gave the album four out of five stars, calling it one of Knopfler's "best scores, alternately graceful and rootsy."

Track listing
All music was written by Mark Knopfler.

Personnel
Music
 Mark Knopfler – guitar, vocals
 Richard Bennett – guitar
 Jim Cox – piano, Hammond organ
 Guy Fletcher – keyboards
 Glenn Worf – bass
 Chad Cromwell – drums

Production
 Mark Knopfler – producer
 Chuck Ainlay – producer
 Mark Ralston – assistant producer
 Denny Purcell – mastering at Georgetown Masters in Nashville
 Don Cobb – digital editing
 Rick Lecoat – design
 Phil Caruso – photography
 Mark Leialoha – photography

References

External links
 Wag the Dog at Mark Knopfler official website
 

1998 soundtrack albums
Albums produced by Mark Knopfler
Albums produced by Chuck Ainlay
Mark Knopfler soundtracks
Comedy film soundtracks
1990s film soundtrack albums